Gubernatorial elections were held in the Philippines on May 13, 2013. All provinces elected their provincial governors for three-year terms who will be inaugurated on June 30, 2013, after their proclamation. Governors that are currently serving their third consecutive terms are prohibited from running as governors (they may run in any other position).

Highly urbanized cities and independent component cities such as Angeles City, Cebu City, and Metro Manila with the municipality of Pateros are outside the jurisdiction of any province and thus won't elect for governors of their mother provinces (Pampanga and Cebu, for Angeles and Cebu City, respectively). These cities and Pateros would elect mayors instead.

Summary
*Election results for Pwersa ng Masang Pilipino, as the Partido Demokratiko Pilipino-Lakas ng Bayan did not win governorships in 2010.**Election results as Lakas-Kampi.

Luzon

Ilocos Region

Ilocos Norte
Incumbent governor Imee Marcos is running for reelection unopposed.

Ilocos Sur
Incumbent governor Chavit Singson is not running. His son, incumbent congressman Ryan Singson is running in his place.

La Union
Incumbent governor Manuel Ortega is running for reelection. His opponent is former congressman Tomas Dumpit.

Pangasinan
Incumbent governor Amado Espino, Jr. is running for reelection. His opponent is incumbent Alaminos Mayor Hernani Braganza. Highest gubernatorial margin in Philippine Election 2013.

Cagayan Valley

Batanes
Incumbent governor Vicente Gato is running for reelection as an independent. His opponent is former governor Telesforo Castillejos.

Cagayan
Incumbent governor Alvaro Antonio is running for reelection.

Isabela
Incumbent governor Faustino Dy III is running for reelection. Candidates Tony Aliangan and Lilia Uy were disqualified by Comelec.

Nueva Vizcaya
Incumbent governor Luisa Cuaresma is term-limited and running for congress instead. Jose Gambito is her party's nominee.

Quirino
Incumbent governor Junie Cua is running for reelection unopposed.

Cordillera Administrative Region

Abra
Incumbent governor Eustaquio Bersamin is running for reelection. His primary opponent is former congresswoman Cecilia Seares-Luna. 
Candidate Joel Bicera Bersamin was disqualified by Comelec.

Apayao
Incumbent governor Elias Bulut, Jr. is running for reelection.

Benguet
Incumbent governor Nestor Fongwan is running for reelection.

Ifugao
Incumbent governor Eugene Balitang is running for reelection.

Kalinga
Incumbent governor Jocel Baac is running for reelection.

Mountain Province
Incumbent governor Leonard Mayaen is running for reelection.

Central Luzon

Aurora
Incumbent governor Bellaflor Angara-Castillo is term-limited and therefore decides to run for Congress instead. Her brother, incumbent Baler Mayor Arturo Angara is running in her place.

Bataan

Incumbent governor Enrique Garcia is term-limited and is running for congressman. His son Albert Raymond Garcia is running in his place.

Bulacan
Incumbent governor Wilhelmino Sy-Alvarado is running for reelection. Candidate Jaime Almera was disqualified by COMELEC .

Nueva Ecija
Incumbent governor Aurelio Umali is running for reelection. His opponent is incumbent congresswoman Josefina Joson.

Pampanga
Incumbent governor Lilia Pineda is running for reelection. Her main opponent is former governor Ed Panlilio.

Tarlac
Incumbent governor Victor Yap is running for reelection. His opponent is incumbent Vice-Governor Pearl Pacada and Dr. Isa Cojuanco-Suntay.

Zambales
Incumbent governor Hermogenes Ebdane is running for reelection. His opponent is former governor Amor Deloso.

Calabarzon

Batangas
Incumbent governor Vilma Santos Recto is running for reelection.

Cavite

Incumbent governor Juanito Victor C. Remulla is running for reelection running against incumbent congressman Ayong Maliksi.

Laguna
Incumbent governor E. R. Ejercito is running for reelection. His opponent is incumbent congressman Edgar San Luis.

Quezon
Incumbent governor David Suarez is running for reelection.

Rizal
Incumbent governor Casimiro Ynares III is running for mayor of Antipolo City. His mother, former governor Rebecca Ynares is running in his place.

Mimaropa

Marinduque
Incumbent governor Carmencita Reyes is running for reelection. Her opponents are vice governor Antonio Uy, Jr. and former governor Jose Antonio Carrion.

Occidental Mindoro
Incumbent governor Josephine Ramirez-Sato is term limited and is running for congresswoman. Incumbent vice governor Mario Gene Mendiola is her party's nominee.

Oriental Mindoro
Incumbent governor Alfonso Umali, Jr. is running for reelection unopposed.

Palawan
Incumbent governor Abraham Kahlil Mitra is running for reelection.

Romblon
Incumbent governor Eduardo Firmalo is running for reelection.

Bicol Region

Albay
Incumbent governor Joey Salceda is running for reelection unopposed.

Camarines Norte
Incumbent governor Edgardo Tallado is running for reelection. His opponent is 1st District Congressman Renato Unico, Jr. and former governor Jesus Typoco, Jr.

Camarines Sur
Incumbent governor Luis Raymund Villafuerte, Jr. is term limited and is running for congressman. His son, Miguel Villafuerte is running in his place. His primary opponents are his grandfather, incumbent congressman Luis Villafuerte, Sr. and former Solicitor-General Jose Anselmo Cadiz.

Catanduanes
Incumbent governor Joseph Cua is running for reelection.

Masbate
Incumbent governor Rizalina Seachon-Lanete is running for reelection. Her opponents are incumbent congressman Antonio Kho and priest Fr. Leo Casas.

Sorsogon
Incumbent governor Raul Lee is running for reelection.

Visayas

Western Visayas

Aklan
Incumbent governor Carlito Marquez is term-limited. Incumbent Congressman Florencio Miraflores is his party's nominee.

Antique
Incumbent governor Exequiel Javier is running for reelection.

Capiz
Incumbent governor Victor Tanco, Sr. is running for reelection.

Guimaras
Incumbent governor Felipe Hilian Nava is running for reelection.

Iloilo
Incumbent governor Arthur Defensor, Sr. is running for reelection, His opponent is incumbent Congressman Ferjenel Biron.

Negros Occidental
Incumbent governor Alfredo Marañon, Jr. successfully contested his reelection. His opponent was Vice Governor Genaro Alvarez, Jr.

Central Visayas

Bohol
Incumbent governor Edgardo Chatto is running for reelection.

Cebu
Incumbent governor Gwendolyn Garcia is term-limited and running for Congress instead. Her brother Congressman Pablo John Garcia is her party and the National Unity Party's nominee.

Negros Oriental
Roel Degamo is the incumbent after the death of the former governor, the late Agustin Perdices, He will face incumbent Congresswoman Jocelyn Limkaichong and former finance secretary Margarito "Gary" Teves.

Siquijor
Incumbent governor Orlando Fua, Jr. running for congressman instead; his brother Orville Fua is his party's nominee.

Eastern Visayas

Biliran
Incumbent Gerardo Espina, Jr. is running for reelection.

Eastern Samar
Incumbent governor Conrado Nicart, Jr. is running for reelection.

Leyte
Incumbent governor Jericho Petilla was appointed Secretary of Energy, Vice Gov. Mimiet Bagulaya assumed as acting governor and is running as board member; Leopoldo Dominico Petilla is her party's nominee.

Northern Samar
Incumbent Gov. Paul Daza is running for reelection.

Samar
Incumbent governor Sharee Ann Tan is running for reelection.

Southern Leyte
Incumbent governor Damian Mercado chose to run for Congressman instead; incumbent Congressman Roger Mercado is his party's nominee.

Mindanao

Zamboanga Peninsula

Zamboanga del Norte
Incumbent governor Rolando Yebes is term-limited, he is running for congressman instead; his party didn't have any nominee, but nominated his ally, Cesar Jalosjos, to run for governor.

Zamboanga del Sur
Incumbent governor Antonio Cerilles is running for reelection. On January 15, 2013, the Commission on Elections disqualified Dominador Jalosjos, Jr. (Nacionalista) who was to run for governor and his brother, Romeo Jalosjos who is a candidate for mayor of Zamboanga City for violating the Local Government Code of 1991 which bars ex-convicts to run for office and run short of the required one-year residency in the place where a candidate can run. Thereby, Cerilles is running for reelection unopposed.

Zamboanga Sibugay
Incumbent governor Rommel Jalosjos is running for reelection.

Northern Mindanao

Bukidnon
Incumbent governor Alex Calingasan is not running for reelection. He is running for Vice Governor instead; Vice Governor Jose Maria Zubiri, Jr. is his party's nominee.

Camiguin
Incumbent governor Jurdin Jesus Romualdo is running for reelection.

Lanao del Norte
Incumbent governor Mohamad Khalid Dimaporo is running for reelection.

Misamis Occidental
Incumbent governor Herminia Ramiro is running for reelection.

Misamis Oriental
Incumbent governor Oscar Moreno is term-limited and will instead run for Mayor of Cagayan de Oro; Vice Governor Norris Babiera is his party's nominee. He will face Congressman Yevgeny Vincente "Bambi" Emano.

Davao Region

Compostela Valley
Incumbent governor Arturo Uy is running for reelection unopposed.

Davao del Norte
Incumbent governor Rodolfo Del Rosario is running for reelection. Candidate Norberto Mijanes was disqualified by Comelec, as a result Governor Del Rosario was running unopposed.

Davao del Sur
Incumbent governor Douglas Cagas is not running for reelection. He is instead running for Mayor of Digos City; Congressman Marc Douglas Cagas IV is his party's nominee.

Davao Oriental
Incumbent governor Corazon Malanyaon is running for reelection unopposed.

Soccsksargen

Cotabato
Incumbent governor Emmylou Taliño-Mendoza is running for reelection. Her main opponent is former governor Emmanuel "Manny" Piñol.

Sarangani
Incumbent governor Miguel Rene Dominguez is term-limited.

South Cotabato
Incumbent governor Arthur Pingoy Jr. is running for reelection. His opponent is incumbent congresswoman Daisy Avance-Fuentes

Sultan Kudarat
Incumbent governor Suharto Mangudadatu is running for reelection as an independent candidate.

Caraga Region

Agusan Del Norte
Incumbent governor Erlpe John Amante is term-limited and will instead run for Congress; His sister, Representative Angelica Amante-Matba is his party's nominee. Candidate Jorge Lomongsod was disqualified by Comelec, as a result Rep. Angelica Amante-Matba was running unopposed.

Agusan del Sur
Incumbent governor Adolph Edward Plaza is running for reelection.

Dinagat Islands
Incumbent governor Glenda Ecleo is running for reelection. Her opponent is her daughter, incumbent vice governor Geraldine Ecleo.

Surigao del Norte
Incumbent governor Sol Matugas is running for reelection. Her primary opponent is former governor Robert Lyndon Barbers.

Surigao del Sur
Incumbent governor Johnny Pimentel is running for reelection.

Autonomous Region in Muslim Mindanao

Basilan
Incumbent governor Jum Akbar is running for reelection.

Lanao del Sur
Incumbent governor Mamintal Adiong, Jr. is running for reelection.

Maguindanao
Incumbent governor Esmael Mangudadatu is running for reelection.

Sulu
Incumbent governor Abdusakur Mahail Tan is not running for reelection. His son, Abdusakur Tan II is running in his place.

Tawi-Tawi
Incumbent governor Sadikul Sahali is term limited; his son, Nurbert Sahali is his party's nominee.

Notes

References

2013 Philippine local elections
2013
May 2013 events in the Philippines